The Bhubaneswar–Anand Vihar Weekly Superfast Express is a Superfast train belonging to East Coast Railway zone that runs between  and  in India. It is currently being operated with 22805/22806 train numbers on a weekly basis.

Service

The 22805/Bhubaneswar–Anand Vihar Weekly SF Express has an average speed of 59 km/hr and covers 1885 km in 32h 5m. The 22806/Anand Vihar Terminal–Bhubaneswar Weekly SF Express has an average speed of 57 km/hr and covers 1885 km in 33h.

Route and halts 

The important halts of the train are:

Coach composition

The train has Hybrid-LHB rakes with a max speed of 110 kmph. The train consists of 17 coaches :
 
 1 First AC 
 2 AC II Tier
 4 AC III Tier
 8 Sleeper coaches
 1 Pantry car
 8 General Unreserved
 2 Seating cum Luggage Rake

Traction

Both trains are hauled by a Vadodara-based WAP-7 electric locomotive from Bhubaneswar to Anand Vihar Terminal.

Rake sharing

The train shares its rake with 12281/12282 Bhubaneswar–New Delhi Duronto Express.

See also 

 Bhubaneswar–New Delhi Duronto Express
 Odisha Sampark Kranti Express

Notes

References

External links 

 22805/Bhubaneswar–Anand Vihar Weekly SF Express
 22806/Anand Vihar–Bhubaneswar Weekly SF Express

Transport in Bhubaneswar
Transport in Delhi
Rail transport in Odisha
Rail transport in Jharkhand
Rail transport in Bihar
Rail transport in Uttar Pradesh
Express trains in India
Rail transport in Delhi
Railway services introduced in 2013